The Griffin–Spragins House (first called the Refuge Plantation House) is located in Refuge, Mississippi, approximately  southwest of Greenville.

Built in approximately 1850, it was listed on the National Register of Historic Places in 1984.

Francis Griffin purchased land in 1831 on a high ridge bordering the Mississippi River where he established "Refuge Plantation".  By 1850, Griffin had 150 slaves working on his plantation.  The "Refuge Plantation House", shaded by oak trees and protected from the river by a levee system, was erected with a view of the river.

The Griffins lost much of their fortune during the Civil War, and were forced to sell the property.  A subsequent owner was Edmund Richardson, one of the wealthiest cotton growers in the south.

The home remains today one of the best examples of a mid-nineteenth-century plantation house in Washington County.

References

Houses on the National Register of Historic Places in Mississippi
Houses completed in 1850
Houses in Washington County, Mississippi
National Register of Historic Places in Washington County, Mississippi